Claonaig is a hamlet on the east coast of the Kintyre peninsula in western Scotland, linked to Lochranza on the Isle of Arran by the CalMac ferry  in the summer months.

The ferry terminal has a small car park and bus shelter for the bus service to Tarbert. The nearest sizeable villages are Tarbert, Skipness and Carradale. To the south, Campbeltown can be reached in  via the B842 coast road or via the B8001 and the A83 which runs down the west coast of Kintyre.

A church was built in Claonaig in 1756. The current Parish Church, built in the late-18th or early-19th century, may incorporate some of its fabric. Its western gable has a bell-cot. It has been converted to a house.

References

Villages in Kintyre